List of Oz characters may refer to:

 List of Oz characters (created by Baum)
 List of Oz characters (post-Baum)
 List of Oz (TV series) characters